Devmanus 2 (-God Figure 2) is an Indian Marathi language crime thriller television series. The show premiered from 19 December 2021 on Zee Marathi by replacing Ti Parat Aaliye. It was produced by Shweta Shinde and directed by Raju Sawant under the banner of Vajra Productions. It stars Kiran Gaikwad and Asmita Deshmukh in lead roles.

Cast

Main 
 Kiran Gaikwad as Dr. Ajitkumar Chandrakant Dev / Natvar Singh (2021–2022)
 Asmita Deshmukh as Sagarika Babu Patil / Sagarika Ajitkumar Dev (Dimple) (2021–2022)

Recurring 
Dimple's family
 Anjali Joglekar as Mangal Babu Patil (2021–2022)
 Ankush Mandekar as Babu Rangrao Patil (2021–2022)
 Viral Mane as Shubhankar Babu Patil (Tonya) (2021–2022)
 Rukmini Sutar as Saru Patil (Aaji) (2021–2022)
 Pushpa Choudhari as Vandi (2021–2022)

Others
 Milind Shinde as Inspector Martand Jamkar (2022)
 Snehal Shidam as Mrs. Jamkar (2022)
 Kiran Dange as Bajarang Patil (2021–2022)
 Nilesh Gaware as Namdev Jadhav (2021–2022)
 Ravina Gogawale as Ravina Bajrang Patil (2021-2022)
 Namantar Kamble as Vinchya (2021-2022)
 Rutuja Kanojiya as Pinky (2021-2022)
 Priya Gautam as Saloni (2021)
 Shivani Ghatge as Neelam Jaysingh (2022)
 Nivya Chemburkar as Madhumati (2022)
 Vaishnavi Kalyankar as Sonu (2022)
 Tejaswini Lonari as Devyani Janardan Gaikwad (2022)
 Vinod Pulavale as Janardan Gaikwad (2022)
 Sandhya Manik as Anandi (2022)
 Swara Patil as Chinu (2022)
 Pankaj Chavan as Devyani's assistant (2022)

Reception

Special episode

1 hour 
 19 December 2021
 26 December 2021
 9 January 2022
 20 February 2022
 6 March 2022
 17 April 2022
 5 June 2022

2 hours 
 17 July 2022 (Will Jamkar catch Ajitkumar?)

References

External links 
 
 Devmanus 2 at ZEE5

Marathi-language television shows
Indian crime television series
Zee Marathi original programming
2021 Indian television series debuts
2022 Indian television series endings